Colotis pallene, also known as the Bushveld orange tip, is a butterfly of the family Pieridae found in southern Africa.

The wingspan is 28–35 mm. The adults fly year-round, peaking in late summer and autumn.

The larvae feed on Capparis species.

References

Butterflies described in 1855
pallene